The Kyiv Chamber Orchestra was founded in 1963 by Anton Sharoyev.

The orchestra's directors have included Sharoev and Ihor Blazhkov.

Since 1990 the Orchestra's Principal Conductor and Artistic Director has been Roman Kofman. The Orchestra has made many recordings and appears frequently on radio and television.  The Orchestra specializes in both classical and contemporary works. Soloists who have performed with the orchestra include Gidon Kremer, Stephen Isserlis, Liana Isakadze, Andrej Hoteev, Natalia Gutman, Elisso Virsaladze, Vladymyr Krainev, Alexei Lyubimov, Boris Pergamenchikov, Misha Maisky, Ivan Monigheti, Lucia Aliberti, Viktoria Lukyanets, and Oleksandr Semchuk.

During the Concert Season 2009–2010, the Kyiv Chamber Orchestra under the baton of Roman Kofman performed all of the  symphonies of Mozart in the Lysenko Concert Hall of the National Philharmonic of Ukraine.

Principal conductors 
 Anton Sharoyev (1963–1969)
 Ihor Blazhkov (1969–1976)
 Anton Sharoyev (1976–1987)
 Arkady Vynokurov (1987–1991)
 Roman Kofman (1991–2016)
 Mykola Diadiura (since 2016)

References

External links
 Kyiv Chamber Orchestra at website of National Philharmonic of Ukraine

Chamber orchestras
Ukrainian orchestras
Music in Kyiv
Ukrainian classical music groups
Musical groups from Kyiv
Musical groups established in 1963
1963 establishments in the Soviet Union
Organizations based in Kyiv